Firminy Vert (lit. "Green Firminy") is group of modern buildings designed by architect Le Corbusier located in Firminy, France in 1964–1969. It includes the Saint-Pierre Church, a stadium, a cultural center, and an Unité d'Habitation. It was designed based on Modernism principles of architecture. It is praised as one of Europe's most accomplished postwar planning exercises.

Buildings
 1965: Unité d'Habitation of Firminy-Vert, France
 1965: Maison de la culture de Firminy-Vert
 1966: Stadium Firminy-Vert
 1969: Church of Saint-Pierre, Firminy (built posthumously and completed under José Oubrerie's guidance in 2006)

References

Luca Sampò, « l’église Saint-Pierre de Firminy, de Le Corbusier : quarante ans d’histoire entre idée et réalisation », Livraisons de l'histoire de l'architecture [Online], 16 | 2008, Online since 10 December 2010, connection on 10 May 2016. URL : http://lha.revues.org/194 ; DOI : 10.4000/lha.194

External links

 Official website

Le Corbusier
Buildings and structures in Loire (department)